Mr. Soul is the ninth studio album by American singer-songwriter Sam Cooke. Produced by Hugo & Luigi, the album was released in February 1963 in the United States by RCA Victor.

The album was remastered in 2011 as a part of The RCA Albums Collection.

Track listing
All songs arranged and conducted by Horace Ott, except "Nothing Can Change This Love" conducted by René Hall.

Side one
 "I Wish You Love" (Léo Chauliac, Charles Trenet, Albert Beach) – 2:24
 "Willow Weep for Me" (Ann Ronell) – 2:26
 "Chains of Love (Ahmet Ertegun, under the pseudonym A. Nugetre) – 2:50
 "Smoke Rings" (Ned Washington, H. Eugene Gifford) – 3:26
 "All the Way" (Sammy Cahn, Jimmy Van Heusen) – 3:29
 "Send Me Some Lovin'" (Leo Price, John Marascalco) – 2:48
Side two
"Cry Me a River" (Arthur Hamilton) – 2:47
 "Driftin' Blues" (Johnny Moore, Charles Brown, Eddie Williams) – 3:17
 "For Sentimental Reasons" (Deek Watson, William Best) – 	3:16
 "Nothing Can Change This Love" (Sam Cooke) – 2:38 	
 "Little Girl" (Madeline Hyde, Francis Henry) – 2:36
 "These Foolish Things" (Eric Maschwitz, Jack Strachey, Harry Link) – 4:01

Personnel
All credits adapted from The RCA Albums Collection (2011) liner notes.
Sam Cooke – vocals
Horace Ott – arrangement and conducting
René Hall – arrangement and conductor on "Nothing Can Change This Love"
Clifton White, Bill Pitman, Tommy Tedesco – guitar
Ray Pohlman, Clifford Hills, Red Callender – bass guitar
Earl Palmer, Sharky Hall – drums
Ron Rich – percussion
Edward Beal, Ernie Freeman, Ray Johnson, Al Pellegrini – piano
Nathan Griffin – organ
Bill Green, Plas Johnson – saxophone
John Ewing – trombone
Israel Baker, Robert Barene, Leonard Malarsky, Myron Sandler, Ralph Schaeffer, Sid Sharp, Autrey McKissack, Arnold Belnick, Jermoe Reisler – violin
Harry Hyams, Alexander Neiman – viola
Jesse Ehrlich, Irving Lipschultz, George Neikrug, Emmet Sergeant – cello
William Hinshaw – French horn
Dave Hassinger – recording engineer

Notes

External links 
 Songs of Sam Cooke: Main Page

1963 albums
Sam Cooke albums
RCA Victor albums
Albums produced by Hugo & Luigi
Albums arranged by René Hall
Albums conducted by René Hall
Albums conducted by Horace Ott
Albums arranged by Horace Ott